The guerrilla war in the Baltic states was an armed struggle which was waged by the Latvian, Lithuanian, and Estonian partisans. Called the Forest Brothers (also the "Brothers of the Wood" and the "Forest Friars"), they fought the Soviet Union during the Soviet invasion and occupation of the three Baltic states both during and after World War II. Similar anti-Soviet Central and Eastern European resistance groups fought against Soviet and communist rule in Bulgaria, Poland, Romania, and western Ukraine.

The Red Army occupied the independent Baltic states in 1940 to 1941 and, after a period of German occupation, it reoccupied them in 1944–1945. As Stalinist repressions intensified over the following years, some 50,000 residents of these countries used the heavily-forested countryside as a natural refuge and base for armed anti-Soviet insurgency.

According to some estimates, 10,000 partisans in Estonia, 10,000 partisans in Latvia, and 30,000 partisans in Lithuania and many other supporters were involved in the insurgency. The war continued to be waged as an organized struggle until 1956, when the superiority of the Soviet security forces, largely in the form of agents who infiltrated the insurgent groups, caused the native population to resort to other forms of resistance.

Background

Origins of the term
The term Forest Brothers first came into use in the Baltic region during the chaotic Russian Revolution of 1905. Varying sources refer to forest brothers of this era either as peasants revolting or as schoolteachers seeking refuge in the forest. This term Forest Brothers was used and known only in occupied Estonia and Latvia, but in Lithuania partisans were called originally:  (Green People),  (Forest People) or just  (Partisans).

Caught between two powers

Estonia, Latvia, and Lithuania gained their independence in 1918 after the collapse of the Russian Empire. The ideals of nationalism and self-determination had taken hold with many people as a result of having the independent states of Estonia and Latvia for the first time since the 13th century. At the same time, Lithuanians re-established a sovereign state, which had a rich former history, having been the largest country in Europe during the 14th century, but which was occupied by the Russian Empire since 1795. Allied declarations such as the Atlantic Charter had offered promise of a post-war world in which the three Baltic states could re-establish themselves. Having already experienced occupation by the Soviet regime followed by the Nazi regime, many people were unwilling to accept another occupation.

Unlike Estonia and Latvia where the Germans conscripted the local population into military formations within the Waffen-SS, Lithuania never had its own Waffen-SS division. In 1944 the Nazi authorities had created an ill-equipped but 20,000-strong "Lithuanian Territorial Defense Force" under General Povilas Plechavičius to combat Soviet partisans led by Antanas Sniečkus. The Germans, however, quickly came to see this force as a nationalist threat to their occupation regime. The senior staff were arrested on May 15, 1944, with General Plechavičius being deported to the concentration camp in Salaspils, Latvia. However, approximately half of the remaining forces formed guerrilla units and dissolved into the countryside in preparation for partisan operations against the Red Army as the Eastern Front approached.

The guerrilla operations in Estonia and Latvia had some basis in Adolf Hitler's authorization of a full withdrawal from Estonia in mid-September 1944 – he allowed any soldiers of his Estonian forces, primarily the 20th Waffen-SS Division (1st Estonian), who wished to stay and defend their homes to do so – and in the fate of Army Group Courland, among the last of Hitler's forces to surrender after it became trapped in the Courland Pocket on the Courland Peninsula in 1945. Many Estonian and Latvian soldiers, and a few Germans, evaded capture and fought as Forest Brothers in the countryside for years after the war. Others, such as Alfons Rebane and Alfrēds Riekstiņš escaped to the United Kingdom and Sweden and participated in Allied intelligence operations in aid of the Forest Brothers.

While the Waffen-SS was found guilty of war crimes and other atrocities and declared a criminal organization after the war, the Nuremberg Trials explicitly excluded conscripts in the following terms:

In 1949–1950 the United States Displaced Persons Commission investigated the Estonian and Latvian divisions and on September 1, 1950, adopted the following policy:

The Latvian government has asserted that the Latvian Legion, primarily composed of the 15th and 19th Latvian Waffen-SS divisions, was neither a criminal nor collaborationist organization.

The ranks of the resistance swelled with the Red Army's attempts at conscription in the Baltic states after the war, with fewer than half the registered conscripts reporting in some districts. The widespread harassment of disappearing conscripts' families pushed more people to evade authorities in the forests. Many enlisted men deserted, taking their weapons with them.

Summer War

With the German invasion of the Soviet Union on June 22, 1941, Joseph Stalin made a public statement on the radio calling for a scorched earth policy in the areas to be abandoned on July 3. About 10,000 Forest Brothers, which had organized themselves into countrywide Omakaitse (Home Guard) organizations, attacked the forces of the NKVD, destruction battalions and the 8th Army (Major General Ljubovtsev), killing 4,800 and capturing 14,000. The battle of Tartu lasted for two weeks, and destroyed a large part of the city. Under the leadership of Friedrich Kurg, the Forest Brothers drove out the Soviets from Tartu, behind the Rivers Pärnu – Emajõgi line. Thus they secured South Estonia under Estonian control by July 10. The NKVD murdered 193 people in Tartu Prison on their retreat on July 8.

The German 18th Army crossed the Estonian southern border on July 7–9. The Germans resumed their advance in Estonia by working in cooperation with the Forest Brothers and the Omakaitse. In North Estonia, the destruction battalions had the greatest impact, being the last Baltic territory captured from the Soviets. The joint Estonian-German forces took Narva on August 17 and the Estonian capital Tallinn on August 28. On that day, the red flag shot down earlier on Pikk Hermann was replaced with the flag of Estonia by Fred Ise only to be replaced yet again by a German Reichskriegsflagge a few hours later. After the Soviets were driven out from Estonia, German Army Group North disarmed all the Forest Brother and Omakaitse groups.

Southern Estonian partisan units were yet again summoned in August 1941 under the name of Estonian Omakaitse. Members were initially selected from the closest circle of friends. Later, candidate members were asked to sign a declaration that they were not members of a Communist organization. Estonian Omakaitse relied on the former regulations of Estonian Defence League and Estonian Army, insofar as they were consistent with the laws of German occupation. The tasks of the Omakaitse were as follows:

 defense of the coast and borders
 fight against parachutists, sabotage, and espionage
 guarding militarily important objects
 fight against Communism
 assistance to Estonian Police and guaranteeing the general safety of the citizens
 providing assistance in case of large-scale incidents (fires, floods, diseases, etc.)
 providing military training for its members and other loyal citizens
 deepening and preserving the patriotic and national feelings of citizens.

On 15 July, the Omakaitse had 10,200 members; on 1 December 1941, 40,599 members. Until February 1944 membership was around 40,000.

Partisan war

By the late 1940s and the early 1950s, the Forest Brothers were provided with supplies, liaison officers and logistical coordination by the British (MI6), American, and Swedish secret intelligence services. That support played a key role in directing the Baltic resistance movement, but it diminished significantly after MI6's Operation Jungle was severely compromised by the activities of British spies (Kim Philby and others)  who forwarded information to the Soviets and enabled the MGB to identify, infiltrate and eliminate many Baltic guerrilla units and cut others off from any further contact with Western intelligence operatives.

The conflict between the Soviet armed forces and the Forest Brothers lasted over a decade and cost at least 50,000 lives. Estimates for the number of fighters in each country vary. Misiunas and Taagepera estimate that figures reached 30,000 in Lithuania, between 10,000 and 15,000 in Latvia and 10,000 in Estonia.  On the other hand, professor Heinrihs Strods, basing on NKVD report, claims that in 1945, 8916 partisans were killed in Lithuania, 715 in Latvia and 270 in Estonia, which makes Lithuanian loses around 90%. Even though the real numbers were even larger, many believe this reveals the ratio of the size of resistance among the three countries.

In Estonia

In Estonia 14,000–15,000 men participated in the fighting between 1944 and 1953: The Forest Brothers were most active in Võru County along the borderlands between Pärnu and Lääne counties that included significant activity between Tartu and Viru counties as well. From November 1944 to November 1947, they carried out 773 armed attacks killing about 1000 Soviets and their supporters. At its peak in 1947, the organization controlled dozens of villages and towns, creating considerable nuisance to the Soviet supply transports that required an armed escort. August Sabbe, one of the last surviving Forest Brothers, was discovered in 1978 by KGB agents posing with his fellow fishermen. Instead of surrendering he leaped into the Võhandu stream and got hooked onto a log, drowning in the process. The KGB insisted that the 69-year-old Sabbe had drowned while trying to escape, a theory difficult to credit given the shallow water and lack of cover at the site. Another noted member of Forest Brothers was Kalev Arro, who evaded capture by disguising himself as a vagrant while hiding in the forests of southern Estonia for 20 years. He was killed in a shooting encounter with KGB agents in 1974.

There were numerous attempts to hunt down relatives of the Forest Brothers. One of the Estonians who managed to escape the deportations was Taimi Kreitsberg. She recalled that Soviet officials "...took me to Võru, I was not beaten there, but for three days and nights I was given neither food nor drink. They told me they were not going to kill me, but torture me [until] I betrayed all the bandits. For about a month they dragged me through woods and took me to farms that were owned by the relatives of Forest Brothers, and they sent me in as an instigator to ask for food and shelter while the Chekists themselves waited outside. I told people to drive me away, as I had been sent by the security organs."

In Latvia

In Latvia, preparations for partisan operations were begun during the German occupation, but the leaders of these nationalist units were arrested by Nazi authorities. Longer-lived resistance units began to form at the end of the war; their ranks were composed of former Latvian Legion soldiers as well as civilians. On 8 September 1944 in Riga, the leadership of the Latvian Central Council adopted a Declaration on the restoration of the State of Latvia. It was intended to restore de facto independence to the Latvian republic. In addition it was hoped international supporters would take advantage of the interval between changeovers of the occupying powers. The Declaration prescribed that the Satversme is the fundamental law of the restored Republic of Latvia, and provided for the establishment of a Cabinet of Ministers that would organise the restoration of the State of Latvia.

Some of the most prominent LCC accomplishments are related to its military branch – General Jānis Kurelis group (the so-called "kurelieši") with Lieutenant Roberts Rubenis battalion which carried out the armed resistance against Waffen SS forces.

The number of active combatants peaked at between 10,000 and 15,000, while the total number of resistance fighters was as high as 40,000. One author gives a figure of up to 12,000 grouped into 700 bands during the 1945–55 decade, but definitive figures are unavailable. Over time, the partisans replaced their German weapons with Soviet makes. The Central Command of Latvian resistance organizations maintained an office on Matīsa Street in Riga until 1947. In some 3,000 raids, the partisans inflicted damage on uniformed military personnel, party cadres (particularly in rural areas), buildings, and ammunition depots. The Communist authorities reported 1,562 Soviet personnel killed and 560 wounded during the entire resistance period.

One account of a typical Forest Brothers action is provided by Tālrīts Krastiņš. He, a reconnaissance soldier of the 19th Waffen Grenadier Division of the SS (2nd Latvian), was recruited with 15 other Latvians into a Nazi stay-behind unit at the close of the war. Escaping to the forest, the group, led by Krastiņš, avoided all contact with local residents and relatives, robbing trucks for money while simultaneously maintaining an apartment in the center of Riga for reconnaissance operations. At first they operated by assassinating low-level Communist party managers, but later focused their efforts on attempting to assassinate the head of the Latvian SSR, Vilis Lācis. The group recruited a Russian woman working at the Supreme Soviet of the Latvian SSR who informed them about Lācis' transportation schedule. They set up a roadside ambush when Lācis was traveling from Riga to Jūrmala, but shot up the wrong car. The second attempt likewise relied on a female collaborator, but one who proved to be an undercover NKVD agent. The entire group was apprehended and sentenced to prison in 1948.

The Latvian Forest Brothers were most active in the border regions, including Dundaga, Taurkalne, Lubāna, Aloja, and Līvāni. In the eastern regions, they had ties with the Estonian Forest Brothers; and in the western regions, with the Lithuanians. As in Estonia and Lithuania, the partisans were killed off and infiltrated by the MVD and NKVD over many years. As in Estonia and Lithuania, assistance from Western Intelligence was severely compromised by Soviet counter-intelligence and Latvian double agents such as Augusts Bergmanis and Vidvuds Sveics. Furthermore, the Soviets gradually consolidated their rule in the cities: help from rural civilians was not as forthcoming, and special military and security units were sent to control the partisans. The last groups emerged from the forest in 1957 to promptly surrender to the authorities.

In Lithuania

Among the three countries, the resistance was best organized in Lithuania, where guerrilla units controlled whole regions of the countryside until 1949. Their armaments included Czech Skoda guns, Russian Maxim heavy machine guns, assorted mortars and a wide variety of mainly German and Soviet light machine guns and submachine guns. When not in direct battles with the Red Army or special NKVD units, they significantly delayed the consolidation of Soviet rule through ambush, sabotage, assassination of local Communist activists and officials, freeing imprisoned guerrillas, and printing underground newspapers.

On July 1, 1944, Lithuanian Freedom Army (Lithuanian: Lietuvos laisvės armija, LLA) declared the state of war against Soviet Union and ordered all its able members to mobilize into platoons, stationed in forests and do not leave Lithuania. The departments were replaced by two sectors – operational, called Vanagai (Hawks or Falcons; abbreviated VS), and organizational (abbreviated OS). Vanagai, commanded by Albinas Karalius (codename Varenis), were the armed fighters while the organizational sector was tasked with passive resistance, including supply of food, information, and transport to Vanagai. In the middle of 1944, Lithuanian Freedom Army had 10,000 members.  The Soviets killed 659 and arrested 753 members of the Lithuanian Freedom Army by January 26, 1945. Founder Kazys Veverskis was killed in December 1944, the headquarters were liquidated in December 1945. This represented the failure of highly centralized resistance, as the organization was too dependent on Veverskis and other top commanders. In 1946 remaining leaders and fighters of LLA started to merge with Lithuanian partisans. In 1949 all members of presidium of Union of Lithuanian Freedom Fighters – captain Jonas Žemaitis-Tylius, Petras Bartkus-Žadgaila, Bronius Liesys-Naktis ir Juozas Šibaila-Merainis came from LLA.

Supreme Committee for the Liberation of Lithuania (Lithuanian: Vyriausiasis Lietuvos išlaisvinimo komitetas, VLIK), was created on November 25, 1943. VLIK published underground newspapers and agitated for resistance against Nazis. Gestapo arrested most influential members in 1944. After the reoccupation of Lithuania by the Soviets, VLIK moved to the West set its goal to maintain non-recognition of Lithuania's occupation and dissemination of information from behind the iron curtain – including the information provided by the Lithuanian partisans.

Former members of Lithuanian Territorial Defense Force, Lithuanian Freedom Army, Lithuanian Armed Forces, Lithuanian Riflemen's Union formed the basis of Lithuanian partisans. Farmers, Lithuanian officials, students, teachers, even the pupils joined the partisan movement. The movement was actively supported by the society and the Catholic church. It is estimated that by the end of 1945, 30,000 armed people stayed in forests in Lithuania.

The partisans were well-armed. During the 1945–1951 Soviet repressive structures seized from partisans 31 mortars, 2,921 machine guns, 6,304 assault rifles, 22,962 rifles, 8,155 pistols, 15,264 grenades, 2,596 mines, and 3,779,133 cartridges. The partisans usually replenished their arsenal by killing istrebiteli, members of Soviet secret-police forces or by purchasing ammunition from Red Army soldiers. Every partisan had binoculars and few grenades. One grenade was usually saved to blow themselves and their faces to avoid being taken as prisoner, since the physical tortures of Soviet MGB/NKVD were very brutal and cruel , and be recognised, to prevent their relatives from suffering.

To combat the guerilla,  in May 1948 the Soviets carried out the largest deportation from Lithuania, Operation Spring, when some 40 to 50 thousand people associated with "forest brothers" were deported to Siberia.

Captured Lithuanian Forest Brothers themselves often faced torture and summary execution while their relatives faced deportation to Siberia (cf. quotation). Reprisals against anti-Soviet farms and villages were harsh. The NKVD units, named People's Defense Platoons (known by the Lithuanians as pl. stribai, from the  – destroyers, i.e., the destruction battalions), used shock tactics such as displaying executed partisans' corpses in village courtyards to discourage further resistance.

The report of a commission formed at a KGB prison a few days after the October 15, 1956, arrest of Adolfas Ramanauskas ("Vanagas"), chief commander of the Union of Lithuanian Freedom Fighters, noted the following:

Juozas Lukša was among those who managed to escape to the West; he wrote his memoirs in Paris – Fighters for Freedom. Lithuanian Partisans Versus the U.S.S.R. and was killed after returning to Lithuania in 1951.

Pranas Končius (code name Adomas) was one of the few last Lithuanian anti-Soviet resistance fighters, killed in action by Soviet forces on July 6, 1965 (some sources indicate he shot himself in order to avoid capture on July 13). He was awarded the Cross of Vytis posthumously in 2000.

Benediktas Mikulis, one of the last known partisans to remain in the forest, emerged in 1971. He was arrested in the 1980s and spent several years in prison.

Decline of the resistance movements

By the early 1950s, the Soviet forces had eradicated most of the Forest Brother resistance. Intelligence gathered by the Soviet spies in the West and MGB infiltrators within the resistance movement, in combination with large-scale Soviet operations in 1952, managed to end the campaigns against them.

Many of the remaining Forest Brothers laid down their weapons when offered an amnesty by the Soviet authorities after Joseph Stalin's death in 1953, although isolated engagements continued into the 1960s. The last individual guerrillas are known to have remained in hiding and evaded capture into the 1980s, by which time the Baltic states were pressing for independence through peaceful means. (See Sąjūdis, The Baltic Way, Singing Revolution)

Aftermath, memorials and remembrances

Many Forest Brothers persisted in the hope that Cold War hostilities between the West, which never formally recognized the Soviet occupation, and the Soviet Union might escalate to an armed conflict in which the Baltic states would be liberated. This never materialized, and according to Mart Laar many of the surviving former Forest Brothers remained bitter that the West did not take on the Soviet Union militarily. (See also Yalta Conference). When the brutal suppression of the Hungarian Revolution in 1956 did not bring about an intervention by, or a supportive response from, Western Powers, organized resistance in the Baltic States declined further.

As the conflict was relatively undocumented by the Soviet Union (the Baltic fighters were formally charged as common criminals), some consider it and the Soviet-Baltic conflict as a whole to be an unknown or forgotten war. Discussion of resistance was suppressed under the Soviet regime. Writings on the subject by Baltic emigrants were often labelled as examples of "ethnic sympathy" and disregarded. Laar's research efforts, begun in Estonia in the late 1980s, are considered to have opened the door for further study.

In 1999, the Lithuanian Seimas (parliament) enacted a declaration of independence that had been made on February 16, 1949, the 31st anniversary of the February 16, 1918, declaration of independence, by elements of the resistance unified under the "Movement of the Struggle for the Freedom of Lithuania".

In Latvia and Lithuania, Forest Brothers veterans receive a small pension. In Lithuania, the third Sunday in May is commemorated as Partisans' Day. In 2005 there were about 350 surviving Forest Brothers in Lithuania.

In a 2001 lecture in Tallinn, U.S. Senator John McCain acknowledged the Estonian Forest Brothers and their efforts.

Forest Brothers in popular culture
The Canadian film Legendi loojad (Creators of the Legend) about the Estonian Forest Brothers was released in 1963. The film was funded by donations from Estonians in exile.

The 1966 Soviet drama film Nobody Wanted to Die by Soviet-Lithuanian film director Vytautas Žalakevičius shows the tragedy of the conflict in which "a brother goes against the brother." The film garnered Žalakevičius the USSR State Prize and international recognition, and is the best-known film portrayal of the conflict.

The popular Soviet Latvian TV film Long Road in the Dunes (1980–1982) touches the topic of Latvian Forest Brothers from a Soviet perspective.

A 1997 documentary film We Lived for Estonia tells the story of the Estonian Forest Brothers from the viewpoint of one of the participants.

Another popular Latvian TV series, Likteņa līdumnieki, produced by Latvijas Televīzija from 2003 to 2008, shows the impact of the struggle (and other historical events from 1885 to 1995) on the life of the Nārbuļi family and their homestead.

The 2004 film Utterly Alone portrays the travails of Lithuanian partisan leader Juozas Lukša, who travelled twice to Western Europe in attempts to gain support for the armed resistance.

The 2005 documentary film Stirna tells the story of Izabelė Vilimaitė (codenames Stirna and Sparnuota), an American-born Lithuanian who moved to Lithuania with her family in 1932. A medical student and pharmacist, she was an underground medic and source of medical supplies for the partisans, eventually becoming a district liaison. She infiltrated the local Komsomol (Communist Youth), was discovered, captured, and escaped twice. After going underground full-time, she was suspected of having been turned by the KGB as an informant and was nearly executed by the partisans. Her bunker was eventually discovered by the KGB and she was captured a third time, interrogated and killed.

The 2007 Estonian film Sons of One Forest follows the story of two Forest Brothers in southern Estonia, who fight with an Estonian from the Waffen-SS against the Soviet occupants.

The 2013 novel Forest Brothers by Geraint Roberts, follows the fortune of a disgraced British Navy officer who returns to Estonia in 1944 for British Intelligence. Many of the people from his past who aid him have taken to the forest, during the ongoing conflict between Germany and the Soviet Union.

Recent examples in Latvian cinematography include the 2014 film Alias Loner, depicting the story of high-ranking resistance fighter and Catholic priest Antons "Vientulis" Juhņevičs and the 2019 TV series Sarkanais mežs ("Red Forest") about Latvian agents sent by MI6 into Soviet-occupied Latvia to find support among local partisans under Operation Jungle.

The last Forest Brother
The last known Forest Brother was Jānis Pīnups, who did not come out of hiding until 1995. He had deserted from the Red Army in 1944 and he was presumed missing in action by Soviet authorities in Latvia. He was rendered unconscious and left for dead during a battle. He decided to return to his home, where he hid in the nearby forest out of fear that his family would be deported, if his desertion was discovered. About 25 years after he went into hiding, he was forced to seek medical assistance and he started to act more freely thereafter. Still, only his siblings and, later on, only his nearest neighbors were aware of who he was, even the rest of his family did not learn that he had not been killed in the war until he came out of hiding.

See also
 Anti-Soviet partisans
 Battle of Määritsa
 Occupation of the Baltic states
 Utterly Alone

References

Sources
 
 Clodfelter, M. (2017). Warfare and Armed Conflicts: A Statistical Encyclopedia of Casualty and Other Figures, 1492–2015 (4th ed.). McFarland.

Further reading
 Daumantas, Juozas L. (1975). "Fighters for Freedom", Manyland Books, New York, 
 
 Razgaitis, Darius. Forest Brothers from the West, research thesis, 2002.
 Rieber, Alfred J. (2003). Civil Wars in the Soviet Union. Kritika: Explorations in Russian and Eurasian History 4.1, 129–162.
 Smit, Mikie (1865). "The Legend of The Forest"
 Vardys, V. Stanley (1965). Lithuania Under the Soviets: Portrait of a Nation, 1940–65, F. A. Praeger, New York

External links
 Genocide and Resistance Research Centre of Lithuania
 Lithuanian Tauras District Partisans and Deportation Museum
 War Chronicle of the Partisans – Chronicle of Lithuanian partisans, June 1944 – May 1949, prepared by Algis Rupainis
 «Forest Brothers – Fight for the Baltics» – official YouTube channel of NATO, 2017
 Documentary examines the fight of the 'Forest Brothers'. 9 October 2020. Public Broadcasting of Latvia.

History of the Baltic states
Guerrilla organizations
Occupation of the Baltic states
1940s in the Soviet Union
1950s in the Soviet Union
Anti-communism in Estonia
Anti-communism in Latvia
Anti-communism in Lithuania
Cold War rebellions
Cold War military history of the Soviet Union
Eastern European World War II resistance movements
Rebellions in the Soviet Union
Estonian Soviet Socialist Republic
Military history of the Soviet Union
Latvian Soviet Socialist Republic
Lithuanian Soviet Socialist Republic
National liberation armies
Resistance in Lithuania
Estonia in World War II
World War II resistance movements
1940s establishments in Europe
1950s disestablishments in Europe
Anti-communist resistance movements in Eastern Europe
Paramilitary organisations based in Latvia
Paramilitary organizations based in Lithuania
Military history of Latvia
Battles involving Latvia
Paramilitary organizations based in Estonia
Anti-communist organizations